Helicoverpa is a genus of moths in the family Noctuidae first described by David F. Hardwick in 1965. Some species are among the worst Lepidopteran agricultural pests in the world, and three species (H. armigera, H. zea, and H. punctigera) migrate long distances both with and without human transportation, mixing resistance alleles along the way.

Extant species
 Helicoverpa armigera (Hübner, 1805) - cotton bollworm
 Helicoverpa assulta (Guenée, 1852)
 Helicoverpa atacamae Hardwick, 1965
 Helicoverpa fletcheri Hardwick, 1965
 Helicoverpa gelotopoeon (Dyar, 1921)
 Helicoverpa hardwicki Matthews, 1999
 Helicoverpa hawaiiensis Quaintance & Brues, 1905
 Helicoverpa helenae Hardwick, 1965
 Helicoverpa pallida Hardwick, 1965
 Helicoverpa prepodes Common, 1985
 Helicoverpa punctigera Wallengren, 1860
 Helicoverpa titicacae
 Helicoverpa toddi Hardwick, 1965
 Helicoverpa zea Boddie, 1850

Extinct species
 Confused moth (Helicoverpa confusa)
 Minute noctuid moth (Helicoverpa minuta)

References

External links
Helicoverpa Diapause Induction and Emergence Tool

 
Heliothinae
Taxonomy articles created by Polbot